The 2020–21 South West Peninsula League season was the 14th in the history of the South West Peninsula League, a football competition in England, that feeds the Premier Division of the Western Football League. The league was formed in 2007 from the merger of the Devon County League and the South Western League, and is restricted to clubs based in Cornwall and Devon. The two divisions of the South West Peninsula League are on the same level of the National League System as the Western League Division One (Step 6).

The constitution was announced on 21 July 2020.

After the abandonment of the previous season due to the COVID-19 pandemic, the league's constitution remained unchanged.

This season, the top two clubs in each division were to be promoted to Step 5. The bottom two clubs in each division would have been liable to relegation.

By October 2020, the poor start to the season suffered by Stoke Gabriel in Premier Division East had attracted attention from the national press. It was the worst start to the season by any club in the top ten levels of English football.

Suspension and curtailment
Fixtures were temporarily suspended on 30 December 2020, again due to the COVID-19 pandemic, but were later suspended until further notice. The FA curtailed the season for all leagues at steps 3–6 on 24 February, with no further league fixtures to be played.

The scheduled restructuring of non-league football took place at the end of the season. Promotions from Step 6 to 5 were based on points per game across all matches over the two abandoned seasons (2019–20 and 2020–21), while teams were promoted to Step 6 on the basis of a subjective application process.

Premier Division East

Premier Division East features 20 teams, unchanged from the previous season.

Honiton Town and Torridgeside were required to install floodlights at their grounds to maintain their membership of the league. Torridgeside complied in October 2020.

League table at time of curtailment

Results table

Premier Division West

Premier Division West also featured 20 teams, unchanged from the previous season.

Dobwalls and St Dennis were required to install floodlights at their grounds to maintain their league status.

League table

Results table

Applications from lower leagues
Ten clubs applied to join the league from lower leagues for 2021–22.
Three were accepted:
Okehampton Argyle (Devon Football League South & West Division)
Ottery St Mary (Devon Football League South & West Division)
Penryn Athletic (St Piran Football League West Division)

Seven were unsuccessful:
Braunton (Devon Football League North & East Division) – withdrew
Bude Town (St Piran Football League East Division) – no planning permission for floodlights
Hayle (St Piran Football League West Division) – withdrew
Newtown (Devon Football League North & East Division) – groundsharing proposal which was not in place by the required date
Teignmouth (Devon Football League North & East Division) – no planning permission for floodlights
Truro City Reserves – not members of a feeder league
University of Exeter (Devon Football League North & East Division) – withdrew

References

External links
 South West Peninsula League

South West Peninsula League
10
South West Peninsula League